Teddy is an unincorporated community in western Casey County, Kentucky, United States. Their Post Office  is no longer in service. It was named by its first post master, Billy Roe Combest, for his son Theodore. The post office closed in 1932.

References

Unincorporated communities in Casey County, Kentucky
Unincorporated communities in Kentucky